, better known by her stage name , is a Japanese singer, songwriter, dancer, costume designer and model from Ibaraki Prefecture, Japan. Originally a member of a music group, Mizuhashi found fame posting videos on the Japanese website Niconico. She is part of the pop rock duo Garnidelia.

Biography
Mizuhashi began her career as a member of the music group Harajuku BJ Girls, later known as the Chix Chicks.

Following Chix Chicks's disbandment in 2010, Mizuhashi pursued a solo career by posting videos on the Japanese website Niconico, where she caught the attention of music producer Yoshinori Abe, also known as Toku, also known as old man 4. Toku produced Mizuhashi's single "Color" which was used as the opening theme to the 2010 anime television series Freezing. The two would later form the music unit Garnidelia, which made its major debut in 2013 with the single "Ambiguous", used as the second opening theme to the anime television series Kill la Kill. Both attained popularity, particularly in China, with the success of their 2016 single Gokuraku Jodo.

Discography

As MARiA

Studio-Albums

Singles

Digital Singles

Indie-Albums

Other appearances

As Mai Mizuhashi

Singles

References

External links 
 Mai Mizuhashi's personal website 
 
 

1992 births
Living people
Musicians from Ibaraki Prefecture
Anime musicians
21st-century Japanese singers
21st-century Japanese women singers
Utaite